William Andrew Holohan (July 1, 1928 – July 23, 2010) was a justice of the Arizona Supreme Court, serving from 1972 until his retirement in 1989. Holohan served as chief justice from 1982 to 1987.

Holohan served as an Assistant United States Attorney to then–United States Attorney Jack D. H. Hays. Holohan was considered conservative in his legal and political views but progressive in judicial reform.

In 1988, Holohan wrote the opinion of the court in Green v. Osborne, a 4–1 decision that canceled a recall election for Evan Mecham because Mecham already had been impeached and removed as governor." Other notable opinions include a "1982 reversal of a lower-court ruling that declared Arizona Downs' lease at Turf Paradise to be unconstitutional and a violation of antitrust laws."

References

1928 births
2010 deaths
Justices of the Arizona Supreme Court
Chief Justices of the Arizona Supreme Court
University of Arizona alumni
20th-century American judges